Al hajji Abdul Nadduli (born 22 December 1942) in Nakaseke district is a Ugandan politician. He is a former minister without portfolio in the Cabinet of Uganda. He was appointed to that position on 6 June 2016, a position he served in until 14 December 2019.

See also
 Cabinet of Uganda
 Parliament of Uganda

References

Living people
Luweero District
Ugandan Muslims
Members of the Parliament of Uganda
Government ministers of Uganda
People from Central Region, Uganda
Place of birth missing (living people)
Year of birth missing (living people)
21st-century Ugandan politicians